The Tithe Act 1540 (32 Hen 8 c 7) was an Act of the Parliament of England.

This Act was repealed by section 1 of, the Schedule to, the Statute Law Revision Act 1887, except as to tithes, offerings and duties which had not been commuted or were otherwise still payable, and except section 5.

The proviso to section 5 was repealed by section 87 of, and Schedule 5 to, the Ecclesiastical Jurisdiction Measure 1963 (No 1).

Section 5, was repealed by section 1 of, and Part II of the Schedule to, the Statute Law (Repeals) Act 1969.

See also
Tithe Act

References
Halsbury's Statutes,

Acts of the Parliament of England (1485–1603)
1540 in law
1540 in England
Tithes